Krishnanagar (also spelled Krishnagar) is a city and a municipality in the Indian state of West Bengal. It is the headquarter of the Nadia district.

History
Krishnanagar municipality was established in 1864 and is one of the oldest municipalities in Bengal. It is claimed to be named after Krishna Chandra Ray (1728–1782). Previously, the city (village) was called ‘Reui’ (রেউই). The Rajbari built here during the reign of Zaminder Krishna Chandra Roy is a prominent tourist attraction, though the remnants of the past glory have been eroded and only a dilapidated structure of the exquisite places with carving on its inner walls remain today.

Geography
The area of the municipality is around 16 km2. It is situated on the southern banks of the Jalangi River. The Tropic of Cancer passes through the outskirts of Krishnanagar. The latitude of the Tropic of Cancer is 23° 26′ 5″ N.

Climate 

Monsoon season prevails, beginning from June to mid-September. Also, retrieving monsoon from mid-October until mid-November

The weather is quite pleasant, the summers and winters are moderate. The level of moisture increases during summers.

Demographics
In the 2011 Indian census, Krishnanagar city had a population of 181,182, with 91,583 males and 89,599 females. It is at the centre of a bigger urban agglomeration which as of the 2011 census, had a population of 2,03,429. The urban agglomeration had a sex ratio of 978 females per 1,000 males. The child sex ratio is 926 girls per 1,000 boys. 7.5% of the population were under six years old. The effective literacy rate was 88.09%, of which male and female literacy was 90.84% and 85.29%, respectively.

The following municipality and census towns were part of Krishnanagar Urban Agglomeration in 2011 census: Krishnanagar (M), Baruihuda (CT), Paschimbhatjangla (CT) and Sonda.

Administration

Krishnanagar city is governed by Krishnanagar Municipality, which comes under Krishnanagar Municipal Region. The area of the municipality is divided into 24 wards with 24 councillors. Krishnanagar is the administrative headquarters of Nadia district. Krishnanagar is the centre for all administration purposes. The parties which contest for the elections are Trinomool Congress, Indian National Congress, BJP, and CPIM. The board of councillors elect a chairman from among its elected members; the chairman is the executive head of the municipality. The elected members of this body are authorised to manage education, health, tourism, and the overall development of the area.

Medical Facilities 
As Krishnanagar is the headquarter of Nadia District, it gets some of the added facilities. Apart from Government Hospitals, there are private-run nursing home as well.

Water
As Krishnanagar is city just beside the Jalangi River (Tributary of River Ganges), one can also avail water transport. Regular boat transport is also available from Krishnanagar to other parts.

Police stations
Kotwali Police Station (also known as Krishnanagar PS) has jurisdiction over Krishnanagar municipality and Krishnanagar I CD Block. The total area covered by the police station is 289.15 km2 and the population covered is 456,969 (2001 census).

Women Police Station was established in 2012.

Transport
Being the district headquarters, residents of Krishnanagar enjoy some unique facilities as far as transport is concerned: wide roads, intracity connectivity by auto rickshaws, cycle rickshaws, E-rickshaws, service buses, and magic taxis (aka Toto). Express buses are available for places like Kolkata, Malda, Siliguri, Berhampore, Howrah, Purulia, Asansol, Durgapur, Bolpur, Kirnahar, Suri, Tarakeswar etc. from the city's Bus Stand or PWD stand very close to NH 34.

Road 
NH 34 passes through Krishnanagar. As Krishnanagar is the administrative headquarters of the Nadia district, it acts as the link between North Bengal and South Bengal. There are bus services on regular basis from South Bengal to North Bengal and vice versa. All buses that start from Kolkata to North Bengal halt at Krishnanagar (Pantha Tirtha/Church Gate/Palpara). Krishnanagar has a main bus stand at the centre of the city, which is a destination of various long, mid-and short-distance places. It is connected directly to Kolkata, Siliguri Bardhaman, Durgapur, Tarakeswar, Siuri, and Asansol by road. Locally, it is connected to Ranaghat, Kolkata, Santipur, Mayapur, and Nabadwip. Krishnanagar is connected with Shikarpur (Route no 1), Patrikabari Ghat (Route no 2A) (via state highway 11), Hridaypur (Route no 4), Ranabandh Ghat (Route no 5), Nabadwip (Route no 8), Ranaghat (Route no 9, 17, 17B), Kalna Ghat (Route no 18), Patuli Ghat (Route no 25), Matiari (Route no 29), Bablari (Route no 30A), Tehatta Ghat (Route no 37), Palashi Monument (Route no 39) and Nonaganj (Route no 41). Krishnanagar is also connected with other places such as Karimpur, Khalboalia, Majdia, Birpur Ghat, Hular Ghat, Katwa Ghat, Hatisala Ghat, Ichapur Ghat, Sibpur Ghat, and Shimulia.

Rail 

Krishnanagar City Junction railway station is a junction on the Lalgola branch line of the Eastern Railway. Local EMU trains are the most convenient option to reach Kolkata.

All trains going to or coming from Lalgola stop at Krishnanagar. MEMU trains depart from Ranaghat heading for Bahrampur and vice versa stops at Krishnanagar.

EMU (Broad gauge local) train service between these two cities Santipur and Krishnanagar have started, and will be extended to Nabadwip and will be open for passengers shortly. 13103/13104 Sealdah-Lalgola Bhagirathi Express, 13113/13114 Hazarduari Express, Lalgola Fast Passenger and a few Lalgola Passenger are the trains that run daily. Kolkata-Lalgola triweekly Express (Dhanadhanye Express) is also an express train that takes the Sealdah-Lalgola route. Ladies special (Matribhumi local) from Krishnanagar to Sealdah runs every day. The line extends to north Bengal via Ajimganj / Nasipur Bridge and will be used by Darjeeling Mail (sdah-njp) from the December at the end of year.

Culture

Krishnanagar is an important centre for culture and literature. It counts literary figures such as Ray Gunakor Bharatchandra, Ramprasad Sen, Dwijendralal Ray and Narayan Sanyal among many others. There is also a strong tradition of stage acting and Indian revolutionary movements. Several elegant pieces of handicraft arts can also be found in this region, namely the handicraft in making of carpet, bamboo and jute crafts, miniature paintings. a horticultural research station and jute nursery, and an agricultural training centre.

Jagaddhatri Puja is celebrated with grandeur in Krishnanagar, when lighting from the town of Chandannagar are brought. The origins of Jagaddhatri Puja in Krishnanagar can be traced back to the 18th century, when it was first celebrated by Maharaja Krishna Chandra, the king of Krishnanagar. Initiated by Krishna Chandra in 1762, is the crowning glory of the annual festival. The Maharaja's absence from the Durga Puja that year left him heartbroken as he could not offer his prayers to Maa Durga. Returning by boat on Dasami, the day of idol immersion, the Maharaja saw the idols being immersed in the river and was overcome with grief. However, in a dream that night, he saw a teenage Goddess seated on a lion, resembling a white horse, assuring him that she would come to him on the Sukla Nabami tithi in the Bengali month of Kartick (October-November). Following her divine instructions, an idol of Goddess Jagaddhatri was sculpted and the puja was performed with great pomp and splendor. Jagaddhatri Puja is celebrated across the Paras of Krishnanagar , with each Paras having its own unique customs and traditions. The Paras are essentially different neighborhoods or communities within the town, each with its own distinct identity and character. The most prominent of them all is Chasapara Barowari Puja where the deity is called Burima. This festival that has been celebrated for over 100 years, is known for its grandeur and splendor. The festival is organized by the Chasapara Barowari Committee, and it is celebrated with great enthusiasm and devotion by the locals. The festival is known for its magnificent pandal decorations, which are designed based on various themes and concepts. The pandals are adorned with colorful lights, flowers, and other decorative items, making them a visual treat for the visitors. During the Puja, the locals also perform a unique ritual called "chokkhudaan" where they offer their eyes to the Goddess in the form of a symbolic gesture. This ritual is believed to signify the devotee's willingness to see the truth and the divine light. The festival is also known for its colorful processions, which are accompanied by the beats of the dhak, a traditional Indian percussion instrument. One of the notable features of this Chasapara Barowari is the heavily adornment of Burima with gold jewellery. It is believed that Burima fulfills her true devotees wishes. 

Krishnanagar is also famous for its Barodol Mela. Maharaja Krishnachandra, a devoted husband, once failed to fulfill his promise of taking his beloved queen to the neighboring fair at Ula Birnagar. To make up for it, he organized a grand festival in his own palace where 12 idols of Krishna were invited for a month-long stay. The tradition continues to this day, with the royal household playing a vital role in the festival's success, even though its splendor has faded somewhat over time.The festival is normally held after the Dolyatra in the Sukla Ekadashi tithi. It begins with the arrival of 12 idols of Krishna , each representing a different form of the deity. The idols are displayed for public viewing for the first three days of the festival, after which they retire to a temple inside the palace as guests of the patron deity Boro Narayan. Meanwhile, the month-long fair takes place in the vast field next to the old fort's gate, open to all who wish to participate. The fairgrounds are alive with the sounds of vendors hawking their wares, performers entertaining the crowds, and children laughing and screaming in delight as they ride the rides. The fair also provides a platform for local artisans to showcase their skills and sell their wares. From the clay toy makers to the handloom weavers, the fair is an opportunity for these artisans to display their products to a wider audience and earn a living.

Places of interest

Ghurni 
The famous area called Ghurni is the birthplace of Yogiraj Sri Shyama Charan Lahiri Mahasaya, fountain-head of Kriya Yoga. Ghurni is the neighbourhood of the clay artists. Open studios and shops of the artists comprise an important attraction for tourists. It is said that initially it was Raja Krishnachandra who had settled a few families of talented clay artists in the area.

Rajbari 

Rajbari, also known as the Krishnanagar Palace, is a royal palace with a Durga temple in the courtyard. The Durga puja was started by Raja Rudra Roy, the great-grandfather of Raja Krishnachandra Roy. Every year, Jhulan Mela is celebrated around the Rajbari in July–August and Baro Dol (as it is held 12 days after Dol Purnima) in March–April every year. Rajbari is mostly visited for the celebration of different festivals. These include the popular Jhulan Mela and the festival of colours Holi or Baro Dol. The historical monument surrounded by a water-body known as Dighi has a beautiful Goddess Durga temple erected in its central courtyard.

Bethuadahari Forest 
Bethuadahari Forest, a forest covering about 67 hectares, is located at Bethuadahari which is situated about 22 km from Krishnanagar. This forest is an extended deer park. The forest was established in 1980 to preserve the biodiversity of the central Gangetic alluvial zone. A census of 1998 reveals a population of 295 deer in this forest and other wildlife includes python, jungle cat, porcupine, monitor lizard, snake, and a variety of birds (around 50 species).

Bahadurpur Forest situated by the side of NH 34 in Krishnanagar II Block has been chosen as a prospective spot for jungle safari. Hasadanga Beel, adjacent to Bahadurpur Forest, is a vast waterbody which can be transformed into a water sports complex. This beel has the potential to be developed as a safe haven for seasonal migratory birds.

Other places of interest
 Adhar Sweets - Adhar Chandra Das & Sons, an authentic and eminent Sweet shop in the heart of the city Krishnanagar offers distinctive, traditional and quality sweets of its own kind. They are the inventor of two famed Bengali sweets Sarpuria and Sarvaja which is famous all over Krishnanagar.
 Sangeeta Cinema Hall.
 Rabindra bhawan
 Krishnagar Hut (demolished)
 Krishnagar Zilla Parishad Conference Hall (demolished)
 College Bhavan (1846)
 Public Library (1856)
 Bagan is a horticultural garden run by the state government.
 Anandamoyi Tola Kali Bari (আনন্দময়ীতলা কালীবাড়ি),
 Siddheshwari Kalibari Mandir (সিদ্ধেশ্বরী কালীবাড়ি মন্দির),
Protestant Church (1840s)
Roman Catholic Diocese of Krishnagar, a Catholic church, is famous for its architectural and sculptural splendour. There are 27 oil paintings describing the life of Lord Jesus Christ. Of special mentions are the wooden sculptures by Italian artists. The Church portrays the awesome architecture and wooden sculpture of that era. There are twenty seven oil paintings depicting the entire life of Jesus Christ.

Notable people

Dwijendralal Ray (1863–1913), Indian poet, playwright, and lyricist, was born in Krishnanagar. Dwijendralal had a literary bent of mind and started writing poems while still in his teens. While still a student, he wrote Aryagatha (Part 1, 1882). During his stay in England, he wrote The Lyrics of Ind in 1886. Among his other books are collections of poems and songs: Aryagatha (Part 2, 1894), Hasir Gan (1900), Mandra (1902), Alekhya (1907), and Triveni (1912). His sketches and satires include Ekghare (1889), Samaj Bibhrat O Kalki Avatar (1895), Tryahasparsha (1900), Prayashchitta (1902), and Punarjanma (1911). He also wrote plays, many of which are included in university syllabi. Among his mythical plays are Pasani (1900), Sita (1908), and Visma (1914). His social plays include Parapare (1912) and Banganari (1916). He also wrote a number of historical plays: Tarabai (1903), Rana Pratapsingh (1905), Mebar Patan (1908), Nurjahan (1908), Sajahan (1909), and Chandragupta (1911). He is specially remembered for his historical plays. He was also a well-known composer of modern songs.
Ramtanu Lahiri (1813–1898) was a young Bengal leader, a renowned teacher, and a social reformer. Peary Chand Mitra wrote about him, “There are few persons in whom the milk of kindness flows so abundantly. He was never wanting in appreciation of what was right, and in his sympathy with the advanced principles.” Sivanath Sastri's Ramtanu Lahiri Tatkalin Bangasamj, published in 1903, was not only his biography but also an overview of Bengali society of the era, “a remarkable social document on the period of the Bengal Renaissance.” It is still widely read and used as reference material for the period.
Jagadananda Roy (1869–1933), a scientific article writer, was born in a landed aristocratic family in Krishnanagar. He taught in a local missionary school for some time. His flair for writing on scientific matters in a simple and lucid style brought him into contact with Rabindranath who was then the editor of Sadhana. Rabindranath found these writings very attractive and when he found that Jagadananda was in dire straits, he offered him a job on his estate. Knowing that this work was not appropriate for someone like Jagadananda, he also asked him to teach his children. When the Brahmacharyasrama was founded, he brought Jagadananda over to Santiniketan as a teacher. He was the first Sarvadhyaksha of the school. A dedicated teacher, he taught continuously until his retirement in 1932, after which he continued to take Mathematics classes voluntarily. He wrote a number of books on popular science, his mission being to propagate scientific truth in simple Bengali in the manner of Ramendrasundar Trivedi. Graha-Nakshatra, Prakritiki, Vaijnaniki, Jagadishchandrer Avishkar, and Banglar Pakhi were some of his books.

Bagha Jatin (born Jatindranath Mukherjee) (7 December 1879 – 10 September 1915) was an Indian Bengali revolutionary philosopher against British rule. He was the principal leader of the Yugantar party that was the central association of revolutionaries in Bengal. Having personally met the German Crown-Prince in Calcutta shortly before World War I, he obtained the promise of arms and ammunition from Germany; as such, he was responsible for the planned German Plot during World War I.
Sudhir Chakravarti (1934 – 2020) was a Bengali educationist and essayist. He made a vast contribution in Bengal's folk culture development and research. Chakravarti had completely changed the style of colonial prose with his new narrative style. He,successfully had replaced the prevailing idea of essay based writing being something of heavy scholarly matter, with his graceful and humorous prose language.
Soumitra Chattopadhyay (1935 – 2020)is an Indian film and stage actor and poet. He is best known for his collaborations with film director Satyajit Ray, with whom he worked in fourteen films, and his constant comparison with the Bengali cinema screen idol Uttam Kumar, his contemporary leading man of the 1960s and 1970s.
Kazi Nazrul Islam, the poet stayed at Grace Cottage, Krishnanagar between 1926 and 1928. Nazrul wrote number of his famous poems, including Daridro, Phani Manasa, Samyabadi, Puber Hawa and the novel Mrityu Khudha while staying in Krishnanagar.

 Hemanta Kumar Sarkar

 Haripada Chattopadhyay

 Dilip Kumar Roy

 Lahiri Mahasaya

 Subhash Mukhopadhyay

 Charles Gmelin (First British Olympic Games award-winning athlete) were born in this city. 
 Pramod Ranjan Sengupta, Socialist revolutionary and member of the Indian National Army

 Dr. Khudiram Das , Ram Tanu Lahiri Professor, Calcutta University

 Monomohun Ghose

 Lalmohan Ghosh

 Bina Das

Educational Institutes
There are various Government and private run schools affiliated with the West Bengal Board of Secondary Education, The Indian Council for Secondary Examination (ICSE), Delhi board and Kendriya Vidyalaya, and the Central Board of Secondary Education (CBSE).

Krishnagar Collegiate School (1846) (the former house of barrister Monomohun Ghose)
C.M.S St. John's High School (Oldest school in Nadia, established 1834)

Krishnanagar Debnath High School
Kendriya Vidyalaya B.S.F., Krishnagar
Krishnanagar High School
Krishnanagar Government Girls' High School
Krishnanagar Lady Carmichael Girls' Higher Secondary School
Krishnanagar A.V. High School (established 1849)
Shaktinagar High School
Holy Family Girls School
Kabi Vijoylal H.S. Institute
Ram Baux Chetlangia High School
Mrinalini Girls High School
Swarnamayee Girls High School
Ghurni High School
Helen Keller Smriti Vidya Mandir
Krishnagar Akshay Vidyapith Girls High School
Kalinagar High School (H.S.)
Krishnagar Anatheswar adarswa Vidya Pith (A.A.V.P.)
Bishop Morrow School (formerly known as Mary Immaculate School)
Krishnanagar Academy (from class 3 to class 12) also known as Ramtanu Lahiri Academy (from lower nursery to class 2)
Krishnagar Public School (KPS)
Don Bosco Higher Secondary School
Jagabandhu Sishu Niketan

Colleges

Government–Operated colleges 

 Krishnagar Government College: The college building is under the Maintenance of ASI, It was established in the year 1846. Various popular dignitaries studied here in past.
 Dwijendralal College
 Krishnanagar Women's College
 Bipradas Pal Chowdhury Institute of Technology (Polytechnic college)

Private colleges
 Global Institute of Management & Technology (GIMT)
 Global College Of Science And Technology (GCST)
 Global Institute Of Education (GIE)
 Global Private Industrial Technical Institute (GPITI)
 Krishnanagar B.Ed. College.
 Pragati ITI

References

Sources
Krishnager 
Encyclopædia Britannica

External links 

Krishnanagar at Encyclopædia Britannica
Krishnanagar at Nadia district gov't website
Latitude and Longitude locations maps in India
City populations in West Bengal
Information of Krishnanagar
Administration in Nadia

 
Cities and towns in Nadia district
Cities in West Bengal